Idamalayar Dam is a multipurpose concrete gravity dam located at Ennakkal  
between Ayyampuzha and Bhoothathankettu in Ernakulam district of Kerala on the Idamalayar, a tributary of the Periyar River in Kerala, South India. The dam however extends east as far as Malakkappara.

The reservoir storage is utilized by a hydroelectric power station which has an
installed capacity of 75 MW with two units of 37.5 MW capacity, producing an annual energy output of 380 GW·h.

The large reservoir created by the Idamalayar Dam is operated by the Kerala State Electricity Board to augment its peak power generation requirements. The dam will benefit the Idamalayar Irrigation Development Project by diverting water released from the tail race channel of the Idamalayar power station.

Geography
The Idamalayar Dam is located on the Idamalayar River, a tributary of the Periyar River in Kerala.

[
{
  "type": "Feature",
  "geometry": { "type": "Point", "coordinates": [77.144167,9.528611, ] },
  "properties": {
    "title": "Mullaperiyar Dam",
   "description": "",
    "marker-symbol": "dam",
    "marker-size": "large",
    "marker-color": "0050d0"
  }
},
{
  "type": "Feature",
  "geometry": { "type": "Point", "coordinates": [76.976111,9.842778 ] },
  "properties": {
    "title": "Idukki Dam",
    "description": "",
    "marker-symbol": "dam",
    "marker-size": "large",
    "marker-color": "0050d0"
  }
},
{
  "type": "Feature",
  "geometry": { "type": "Point", "coordinates": [76.966944,9.845278] },
  "properties": {
    "title": "Cheruthoni Dam",
   "description": "",
    "marker-symbol": "dam",
    "marker-size": "large",
    "marker-color": "0050d0"
  }
},
{
  "type": "Feature",
  "geometry": { "type": "Point", "coordinates": [76.886208,9.803163] },
  "properties": {
    "title": "Kulamavu Dam",
   "description": "",
    "marker-symbol": "dam",
    "marker-size": "large",
    "marker-color": "0050d0"
  }
},
{
  "type": "Feature",
  "geometry": { "type": "Point", "coordinates": [ 77.124,10.106] },
  "properties": {
    "title": "Mattupetty Dam",
   "description": "",
    "marker-symbol": "dam",
    "marker-size": "large",
    "marker-color": "0050d0"
  }
},
{
  "type": "Feature",
  "geometry": { "type": "Point", "coordinates": [76.957008,9.962278] },
  "properties": {
    "title": "Lower Periyar Dam",
    "marker-symbol": "dam",
    "marker-size": "large",
    "marker-color": "0050d0"
  }
},
{
  "type": "Feature",
  "geometry": { "type": "Point", "coordinates": [77.001473,9.980030] },
  "properties": {
    "title": "Kallarkutty Dam",
    "description": "",
    "marker-symbol": "dam",
    "marker-size": "large",
    "marker-color": "0050d0"
  }
},
{
  "type": "Feature",
  "geometry": { "type": "Point", "coordinates": [76.705833,10.221667] },
  "properties": {
    "title": "Idamalayar Dam",
   "description": "",
    "marker-symbol": "dam",
    "marker-size": "large",
    "marker-color": "0050d0"
  }
},
{
  "type": "Feature",
  "geometry": { "type": "Point", "coordinates": [77.207306,10.009515] },
  "properties": {
    "title": "Anayirankal Dam",
   "description": "",
    "marker-symbol": "dam",
    "marker-size": "large",
    "marker-color": "0050d0"
  }
},
{
  "type": "Feature",
  "geometry": { "type": "Point", "coordinates": [77.198621,10.143595] },
  "properties": {
    "title": "Kundala Dam",
   "description": "",
    "marker-symbol": "dam",
    "marker-size": "large",
    "marker-color": "0050d0"
  }
},
{
  "type": "Feature",
  "geometry": { "type": "Point", "coordinates": [77.056512,9.960360] },
  "properties": {
    "title": "Ponmudi Dam",
   "description": "",
    "marker-symbol": "dam",
    "marker-size": "large",
    "marker-color": "0050d0"
  }
},
{
  "type": "Feature",
  "geometry": { "type": "Point", "coordinates": [77.105991,9.810328] },
  "properties": {
    "title": "Erattayar Dam",
   "description": "",
    "marker-symbol": "dam",
    "marker-size": "large",
    "marker-color": "0050d0"
  }
},
{
  "type": "Feature",
  "geometry": { "type": "Point", "coordinates": [77.156116,9.825427] },
  "properties": {
    "title": "Kallar Dam",
   "description": "",
    "marker-symbol": "dam",
    "marker-size": "large",
    "marker-color": "0050d0"
  }
},
{
  "type": "Feature",
  "geometry": { "type": "Point", "coordinates": [77.131603,9.865756] },
  "properties": {
    "title": "Manjapetty Dam",
   "description": "",
    "marker-symbol": "dam",
    "marker-size": "large",
    "marker-color": "0050d0"
  }
},
{
  "type": "Feature",
  "geometry": { "type": "Point", "coordinates": [77.032641,10.010893] },
  "properties": {
    "title": "Sengulam Dam",
   "description": "",
    "marker-symbol": "dam",
    "marker-size": "large",
    "marker-color": "0050d0"
  }
},
{
  "type": "Feature",
  "geometry": { "type": "Point", "coordinates": [76.984157,10.273428] },
  "properties": {
    "title": "Lower Nirar Dam",
   "description": "",
    "marker-symbol": "dam",
    "marker-size": "large",
    "marker-color": "0050d0"
  }
},
{
  "type": "Feature",
  "geometry": { "type": "Point", "coordinates": [77.023392,10.298563] },
  "properties": {
    "title": "Upper Nirar Weir",
   "description": "",
    "marker-symbol": "dam",
    "marker-size": "large",
    "marker-color": "0050d0"
  }
},
{
  "type": "Feature",
  "geometry": { "type": "Point", "coordinates": [76.662222,10.136389] },
  "properties": {
    "title": "Bhoothathankettu",
   "description": "",
    "marker-symbol": "dam",
    "marker-size": "large",
    "marker-color": "0050d0"
  }
}

]

Water resources
Based on detailed hydrological analysis, with observed data supplemented by rainfall-runoff correlation and prediction of low flows during dry months, the mean annual runoff was estimated as about 1,207 million cubic meters (million cubic metres) and that at 95% availability as 730 million cubic metres. Therefore, the live storage in the reservoir was fixed at 1,032.3 million cubic metres. However, subsequent to the commissioning of the project in 1987, availability of the flows was reassessed. It was noted that flows reduced to 1,178 million cubic metres in dry season and reached 4,361 million cubic metres during the monsoon. The total annual flow was assessed as 5,539 million cubic metres. As irrigation requirements are not critical during monsoon season the assessment of dry weather flows is relevant for irrigation.

Further, Idamalayar storage is being supplemented from diversion of flows from the Peringalkuthu Reservoir during the monsoon season through the Vachumaram diversion canal constructed during 1997. The water stored in the reservoir is used for energy generation during the monsoon season by adopting a suitable reservoir operational schedule so that the water diverted from the diversion canal is not spilled out.

Structural details

The reservoir has a gross storage capacity of 1,089.0 million cubic metres of which the effective storage is 1,017.8 million cubic metres.

Instrumentation is provided in the Idamalayar Dam and the observations carried out are analysed regularly to monitor the safety of the structure. However, a rehabilitation project envisaging improving the safety and operational performance of selected structures such as dams, barrages and regulators, which covers 19 projects under the Irrigation Department and 12 projects of the Kerala State Electricity Board, has been approved under the World Bank funded "Dam Rehabilitation and Improvement Project (DRIP)" to be implemented from January 2011. Idamalayar Dam is one of the projects included in this programme. However, the rehabilitation work on this dam is proposed to be taken up in the second stage.

Power Generation
Idamalayar project is a low head Hydro Electric Scheme located in Ernakulam District. The power house is situated downstreams of the dam. Installed capacity of the Project is 75 MW. It is in the fifth position in Kerala in terms of Installed capacity. There is a power tunnel of  length from where 2 penstock pipes takes the water to the power house. Two generators of 37.5 MW capacity produce the electricity. The units were commissioned in 1987 February. They generate 380 Million Units of power annually. There are two feeders from this Power house. First one is to Chalakudy and to Madakkathara from there and the second one is to Malayattur, perumbavur and joins the power grid in Kalamassery.

Irrigation benefits

Irrigation benefits from the water stored in the Idamalayar Reservoir are proposed by utilizing the tail-race water released from the Idamalayar Power house. For this purpose, the project titled "The Idamalayar Irrigation Project" is under implementation. Under this project, the tail race discharge from the Idamalayar powerhouse is picked up at the barrage constructed across the Periyar River at Bhoothathankettu and diverted through a canal system on the right bank of the barrage. The project is under implementation since 1981. The cost of the project was initially Rs 18.5 crores (about US$411.11 million), which as per latest reports of 2007 is stated to be Rs. 539.50 crores (US$1198.9 million). According to the Annual Plan 2010–2011 of the State Government, substantial work of the main canal, the low level canal and the link canal still needs to be completed to derive full planned benefits of irrigation.

Apart from power and irrigation benefits, the project situated in scenic forest area also provides recreational benefits of boating in the reservoir, bird watching and trekking.

Construction delays
The Idamalayar Dam project was started in 1970 and completed after 17 years. In an analysis carried out in 2001 on the reasons for the delay in completion of Hydropower Projects resulting in immense cost overruns in Kerala, it was noted that the Idamalayar project could be commissioned only in 1987 with a time overrun of 9 years and consequent cost overrun of 285% resulting in a capital cost of Rs 2.81 per kWh of generation. While technical reasons for the delays were fully documented, the delay highlighted, however, was attributed to the "irrational behaviour of the organized militant labour". A High Level Committee set up by the Government of Kerala, which examined this issue, observed that the Idamalayar Dam project has been the "victim of recurring and long inertial periods of labour unrest".

There was also controversy over the contract awards.
The government appointed Justice K. Sukumaran to inquire into allegations related to the Idamalayar and Kallada dam construction contracts. 
Based on his report, Minister R. Balakrishna Pillai and others were prosecuted by a Special Court.
The Kerala high court later acquitted them, but in February 2011 the Supreme Court of India sentenced R. Balakrishna Pillai and two others to a year in prison for abusing their positions when awarding the contracts.

Birds

In the reservoir area of the Idamalayar Dam, several species of birds have been reported. The reservoir and surrounding areas are very rich in bamboo. The birds found are: heart-spotted woodpecker, common flameback, black rumped flameback, greater flameback, crimson-fronted barbet, Malabar grey hornbill, Malabar trogon, dollarbird, Oriental dwarf kingfisher, stork-billed kingfisher, common hawk cuckoo, plum-headed parakeet, Malabar parakeet, white-rumped needletail, brown-backed needletail, jungle owlet, green imperial pigeon, emerald dove, grey-fronted green pigeon, river tern, brahminy kite, hornbill, grey-headed fish eagle, black eagle, Oriental honey buzzard, rufous-bellied hawk-eagle, little heron, Asian openbill, fairy bluebird, small minivet, bar-winged flycatcher-shrike, black-naped monarch, Asian paradise flycatcher, Malabar whistling thrush, rusty-tailed flycatcher, white-bellied blue-flycatcher, Indian blue robin, chestnut-tailed starling, velvet-fronted nuthatch, great tit, dusky crag martin, red-rumped swallow, Asian koel, yellow-browed bulbul, Wayanad laughingthrush, dark-fronted babbler, rufous babbler, Nilgiri pipit, yellow-billed babbler, brown-cheeked fulvetta, plain flowerpecker, crimson-backed sunbird, and little spiderhunter. white bellied wood pecker

References

External links
 Short film about the Dam by KSEB

External links

Dams in Kerala
Buildings and structures in Ernakulam district
Buildings and structures completed in 1985
1985 establishments in Kerala
20th-century architecture in India